Volleyball South Australia is the administrative body for volleyball in South Australia.  They manages the State League as well as various lower tier leagues such as the Murray Park Volleyball League.

External links
 http://www.sportingpulse.com/assoc_page.cgi?c=1-3488-0-0-0&sID=83282

Sports governing bodies in South Australia
Volleyball organizations
Volleyball in Australia